twiGIS is a web-based geographical information system software, developed by  (former CAD Studio, part of the European group Arkance). Compatible with standard GIS and mapping technologies, like QGIS, PostGIS, AutoCAD Map 3D, What3words and ESRI, twiGIS uses a responsive user-centric web tool for publishing and managing wide range of geographic and infrastructure data as well as CAD and BIM data for utility networks and for maintenance management and facility management (CAFM) applications. You can use any type of mapping data, such as high resolution aerial images, open web maps, vector maps, CAD drawings, BIM models (e.g. from Autodesk Revit) and databases. twiGIS supports Microsoft Edge, Google Chrome, Mozilla Firefox and Safari web browsers.

Licensing
twiGIS is a commercial software installable on-premise or cloud-based, with subscription type licensing. Available also through resellers in Slovakia, Hungary and Finland.

Adoption
Many public and private organizations have adopted twiGIS (over 6.000 users), including:
 ČEZ Group (Czechia)
 Pannon-víz Győr (Hungary)
 Bratislavská vodárenská spoločnosť (Slovakia)
 Brno Exhibition Centre
 Roman Catholic Archdiocese of Prague
 Air Traffic Control Czech Rep.
 Sokolovská uhelná – mining
 Széphő Székesfehérvár

twiGIS was awarded 'Project of the Year' by IFMA CZ in 2016 and in 2020.

See also 
 List of geographic information systems software

References

External links
 twigis.eu
 GISforum blog in Czech

GIS software